Papuellicesa is a genus of flies belonging to the family Sphaeroceridae (lesser dung flies). it contains a single species, Papuellicesa scrobifera, which is native to New Guinea. It formerly named Papuella, but this was a junior homonym of a genus of beetle.

Species
P. scrobifera (Richards, 1973)

References

 

Sphaeroceridae
Diptera of Australasia
Brachycera genera